The Brahma Samhita is a Sanskrit Pancharatra text, composed of verses of prayer spoken by Brahma glorifying the Lord Vishnu, as well as his avatars such as Krishna, at the beginning of creation. 

It is revered within Gaudiya Vaishnavism, whose 16th-century founder, Chaitanya Mahaprabhu (1486–1534), rediscovered a part of the work, the 62 verses of chapter five, which had previously been lost for a few centuries, at the Adikesava Perumal Temple, Kanyakumari in South India. Mitsunori Matsubara, in his Pañcarātra Saṁhitās and Early Vaisṇava Theology dates the text at c. 1300 CE. The text contains a highly esoteric description of Krishna in His abode, Goloka.

In 1970, George Harrison produced a modern recording of these prayers performed by devotees of the Radha Krsna Temple in London. Titled "Govinda", the song took its title from the main chorus line of the prayer "govindam ādi-puruṣam tam ahaṁ bhajāmi", meaning "I worship Govinda, the primeval Lord". This prayer was sung by Yamunā Devi, a disciple of A.C. Bhaktivedanta Swami Prabhupada.

Sri Madhvacharya  (CE 1199-1278 or CE 1238–1317) of Brahma Sampradaya in his Brahmsutra commentary has quoted Sri Brahma Samhita multiple times.

Recovered text
The recovered fragment of the Śrī Brahma-samhitā commences at the fifth chapter, whose first verse states:

īśvaraḥ paramaḥ kṛṣṇaḥ sac-cid-ānanda-vigrahaḥ
anādir ādir govindaḥ sarva kāraṇa kāraṇam

This translates to:

Krishna, who is known as Govinda, is the Supreme Personality of Godhead. He has an eternal blissful spiritual body. He is the origin of all. He has no other origin and He is the prime cause of all causes.

The text was first translated from Sanskrit into English by Bhaktisiddhanta Saraswati in 1932 and is often sung or recited as both a devotional and philosophical text.

See also
Satchitananda
Lord's Prayer
Achintya Bheda Abheda
Brahma Sampradaya
Jiva Goswami
Garga Samhita

References

Further reading
 Bhaktisiddhanta Sarasvati, Goswami, (trans.),  Sri Brahma-Samhita, with commentary by Srila Jiva Goswami, Sri Gaudiya Math 1932, reprint The Bhaktivedanta Book Trust, Los Angeles, 1985.
 Matsubara, Mitsunori, Pancaratra Samhitas and Early Vaisnava Theology,  Motilal Banarsidass, New Delhi, 1994.
 Narayana, Bhaktivedanta, Swami, (trans.), Sri Brahma Samhita, Fifth Chapter, with the full commentary by Srila Jiva Goswami, Gaudiya Vedanta Publications, Vrindavana UP, 2003.
 Otto Schrader, F., Introduction to the Pañcarātra and the Ahirbudhnya Saṁhitā,   Adyar Library, Madras 1916. Second edition 1973.
 Sagar, B.A., Tridandi Bhiksu, (trans.),  Śrī Brahma Saṁhitā, Quintessence of Reality the Beautiful, with the commentary by Srila Bhaktivinoda Thakur, Sri Chaitanya Saraswat Math, Nabadwip 1992.

External links
 Śrī Brahma Saṁhitā, Chapter 5, English translation with commentary by Bhaktisiddhanta Sarasvati Thakura
 Foreword to Brahma Saṁhitā by Bhaktisiddhanta Sarasvati (vedabase.com)

Vaishnavism
Hindu texts